Paavo Hukkinen (27 October 1911 in Hanover, Germany – 7 June 1988 in Helsinki) was a German-Finnish actor.
 
Hukkinen entered film in 1937 starring in the film Tukkijoella and appeared in some 70 Finnish films and TV series between then and his retirement from acting in 1986.

Hukkinen starred alongside actors Antti Litja, Kauko Helovirta and Markku Huhtamo in the 1977 film Jäniksen vuosi a film about a Finnish man from Helsinki who leaves to find a new life in the wilderness.

His last appearance was in 1986.

Hukkinen died in 1988 aged 76.

Selected filmography
 Miriam (1957)
 Kaks' tavallista Lahtista (1960)
 The Scarlet Dove (1961)
 Jäniksen vuosi (1977)

External links

1911 births
1988 deaths
Finnish male television actors
Finnish male film actors
German male film actors
Actors from Hanover
20th-century German male actors
German emigrants to Finland